

References

Villages in Ostrołęka County